Agaleorhynchus is an extinct genus of Sclerorhynchidae from the Cretaceous period. It is named after Professor Andy Gale, in recognition of his work on Cretaceous chalk stratigraphy. It is known from a single species, A. britannicus, which is currently restricted to the middle Santonian to early Campanian of southern England.

References

Cretaceous cartilaginous fish
Sclerorhynchidae
Prehistoric cartilaginous fish genera